DHSC may refer to:

 Department of Health and Social Care of the United Kingdom
 Department of Health and Social Care (Isle of Man)
 DHSC (football club) of Utrecht, Netherlands
 Doctor of Health Science (D.H.Sc.)